The men's team competition of the 2011 World Judo Championships was held on August 28. Each team consists of five competitors, one each from the –66, –73, –81, –90 and +90 kg categories.

Medalists

Results

Bracket

Repechage

References
 Draw

External links
 

Mens team
World Men's Team Judo Championships
World 2011